Liturgical Jazz is the first studio album by tenor saxophonist/composer-arranger Ed Summerlin. It was recorded and released in 1959 on the Ecclesia label.

Reception
Liturgical Jazz was billed as "a musical setting of an order of morning prayer." Down Beat awarded the album 4½ star stars, writing that "the combination of music and speech builds to tingling climaxes." It praised in particular Summerlin's deployment of a "drum solo behind the benediction," as well as "the walking bass backing the general confession," noting that these choices are "not only imaginative but also serve a function of greatly enhancing these parts of the service.

Track listing
 Prelude
 Collect for purity of heart
 Hymn of praise: "Love Divine" (Charles Wesley)
 Service of Confession: Scripture sentences; Call to Confession; General Confession; Prayer of Absolution; The Lord's Prayer -- Service of the Word: Versicle; Venite ; Old Testament hymn (Psalm 6) ; Old Testament Lesson (Hosea 14:1-7,9)
 Te Deum
 New Testament Lesson (II Peter 1:3-11)
 Benedictus
 The Apostles' Creed
 Witness to the Word: Sermon
 Service of Offering: Song Without Words (In place of Anthem); Versicle; Collect of the Day; Collect for Peace; Collect for Grace to Live Well; The Grace
 After-service: Hymn: "Soldiers of Christ, Arise" (Charles Wesley)

All track information accessed via the UMKC's Nichols Library collection.

Personnel
Composed and conducted by Ed Summerlin.
Text read by Roger Ortmayer.
Featured soloists:
Ed Summerlin – tenor saxophone
Tom Wirtel – trumpet

References

1959 debut albums
Jazz albums by American artists
Christian liturgical music